Jon Dwane "Jaguar Jon" Arnett (April 20, 1935 – January 16, 2021) was an American professional football player.  He was a first-team All-American out of USC and Manual Arts High School.

Arnett died on January 16, 2021, from heart failure in Lake Oswego, Oregon.

College career
Arnett was the multiple recipient of the W. J. Voit Memorial Trophy as the outstanding football player on the Pacific Coast. Arnett won the Voit Trophy in both 1955 1956. He was inducted into the USC Athletic Hall of Fame in 1994 and the College Football Hall of Fame in 2001 as a member of the USC Trojans.

1954: 96 carries for 601 yards and 7 TD. 3 catches for 104 yards and 2 TD.
1955: 141 carries for 672 yards and 11 TD. 6 catches for 154 yards and 3 TD.
1956: 99 carries for 625 yards and 6 TD. 2 catches for 38 yards.

Professional career
Arnett was a five-time Pro Bowler with the Los Angeles Rams from 1957 to 1963 and played with the Chicago Bears from 1964 to 1966. He was known by the popular nickname of Jaguar Jon Arnett.

NFL career statistics

Retirement
Arnett ran a distribution service and supplied frozen foods to Costco, Sam's Club, and Wal-Mart. After living for many years in Rancho Palos Verdes, Arnett and his family moved to Lake Oswego, Oregon.

References

1935 births
2021 deaths
American football return specialists
American football running backs
Chicago Bears players
Los Angeles Rams players
USC Trojans football players
College Football Hall of Fame inductees
Western Conference Pro Bowl players
Sportspeople from Lake Oswego, Oregon
Players of American football from Los Angeles